The Moncton Aigles Bleues women's ice hockey team represents the University of Moncton in U Sports women's ice hockey. The Aigles Bleues compete in the Atlantic University Sport (AUS) Conference in the U Sports athletic association. The program has won three conference championships and has made four national championship tournament appearances with their best finish occurring in 2009 with a bronze medal victory.

History
At the midway point of the 2008-09 CIS season, Mariève Provost led the CIS in scoring with 15 goals and 27 assists in 11 conference games. She represented Canada in their entry at the 2009 World Universidade, which was the first appearance for the Canadian women in ice hockey at the Universidade. Provost finished the seven game tournament with seven points (four goals, three assists).

On March 22, 2009, les Aigles Bleues participated in the bronze medal game of the 2009 CIS National Championships. Provost scored the game-winner in a shootout with a 3-2 victory over the Manitoba Bisons. Moncton was the fourth-seeded team in the tournament and captured the Atlantic conference's first-ever medal at the CIS women's hockey championship.

In the first 12 conference games of the 2010-11 CIS season, Provost led the CIS in scoring with 30 points (14-16-30). At the midway point of that season, she ranked third in CIS all-time scoring with 205 points (105-100-205).

All-time points record

The weekend of February 12 and 13, 2011, Marieve Provost earned two goals and three assists over two games to increase her career totals to 108 goals and 107 assists. She reached 215 points in 102 regular season matches. Heading into the weekend, she was tied with former Alberta Pandas player Danielle Bourgeois with 106 goals. She required four points to break the scoring record of 213 set by Tarin Podloski, also from Alberta.  
She scored her 107th career goal on February 12, during the power play in a 6-2 road win over Saint Mary’s. In the third period of that same game, she tied Podloski’s point record. Provost logged an assist on Valérie Boisclair’s goal. The following day, she assisted on Kristine Labrie’s goal to pick up career point 214, against St. Thomas. In overtime, Provost would assist on another goal by Boisclair, the game winning tally.

Recent results

Awards and honours

University Awards
Marie-Pier Arsenault, 2012 Université de Moncton Female Rookie of the Year
Geneviève David, 2012 Université de Moncton Female Athlete of the Year
Marieve Provost, 2010-11 Université de Moncton Female Athlete of the Year

AUS Awards
2006-07: Rhéal Bordage - AUS Coach of the Year
2008-09: Denis Ross - AUS Coach of the Year
2009-10: Denis Ross - AUS Coach of the Year
2013-14: Denis Ross - AUS Coach of the Year

Rookie of the Year
1999-00: Guylaine Haché  
2006-07: Marieve Provost
2011-12: Marie-Pier Arsenault 
2014-15: Katryne Villeneuve

AUS Most Valuable Player
2006-07: Marieve Provost 
2008-09: Kathy Desjardins 
2009-10: Marieve Provost 
2010-11: Marieve Provost 
2018-19: Katryne Villeneuve

AUS All-Stars
Kathy Desjardins, 2009-10 AUS First Team All-Star
Mariève Provost, 2009-10 AUS First Team All-Star
Valérie Boisclair, 2009-10 AUS Second Team All-Star
Katryne Villeneuve, 2018-19 AUS First Team All-Stars

U Sports
 Mariève Provost, 2009 CIS Playoff All-Star team
Marieve Provost, 2010-11 CIS Scoring Champion

U Sports All-Stars
 Mariève Provost, 2007-08 CIS First Team All-Star 
 Mariève Provost, 2009-10 CIS First Team All-Star
Mariève Provost, 2010-11 CIS First Team All-Star
Émilie Bouchard, 2015-16 U Sports Second Team All-Canadian

U Sports All-Rookie
 Marie-Pier Arsenault, 2011-12 CIS All-Rookie Team
Rhéal Bordage, 2006-07 CIS Coach of the Year
Kathy Desjardins, 2008-09 CIS All-Rookie Team
 Mariève Provost, 2007-08 CIS All-Rookie team

International

References

Université de Moncton
Sports teams in New Brunswick
U Sports women's ice hockey teams
Women's ice hockey teams in Canada
Women in New Brunswick